Anna Lukens (October 29, 1844 – June 27, 1917) was an American physician from Philadelphia, Pennsylvania who practiced medicine, had leadership roles in hospitals and taught medicine. She was a vice-president of the New York Committee for the Prevention and State Regulation of Vice.

Early life and education
Lukens was born in Philadelphia on October 29, 1844. Between 1855 and 1870, her family were residents of Plymouth, Pennsylvania, and belonged to the Society of Friends. She was educated in Philadelphia at the Friends' Seminary.

She studied at the Woman's Medical College of Pennsylvania under Dr. Hiram Corson beginning in 1867 and graduated from the school on  March 13, 1870. While attending clinics in the Pennsylvania Hospital in November 1869, the first time women students attended the hospital, she and a Miss Brumall led a line of women students out of the hospital grounds amid hisses, jeers, insults, and thrown stones and mud from male students.

Career
In 1870, Lukens entered the Woman's Hospital of Philadelphia as an intern.  In May of that year, she became the first woman to become a member of one of the medical societies in the states when she became an elected member of the Montgomery County Medical Society. The following year, she began to teach at the college as an instructor in the chair of physiology.

In 1872, she taught pharmacy in the college by lectures and practical demonstrations in the dispensary of the Women's Hospital. She was the first woman to apply for admission to the Philadelphia College of Pharmacy, but discouraged by the reception there, she studied analytical chemistry in the laboratory of Dr. Walls at the College of Pharmacy in New York City.

She became an attending physician of the Western Dispensary for Women and Children in 1873, and at some portions of the time paid the rent for this dispensary out of her own pocket in order to keep up the work. The same year, she was elected a member of the New York County Medical Society.

In 1877, she was appointed assistant physician in the Nursery and Child's Hospital of Staten Island, assuming responsibility of the pharmaceutical department. She became appointed resident physician of the hospital in 1880.

Two papers which she read before the Staten Island Clinical Society were published in the New York Journal and copied in the London Lancet and received favorable notice by the British Medical Journal. In 1884, she went abroad to study children's diseases in the principal hospitals of Europe. She later opened an office for private practice in the city of New York and was then elected consulting physician of the Nursery and Child's Hospital of Staten Island, and a fellow of the New York State Medical Society. She was appointed in 1876, one of the vice-presidents of the New York Committee for the Prevention and State Regulation of Vice.

She was a member of the Sorosis Club and is considered a woman of marked executive ability for hospital administration. In The Part Taken by Women in American History (1912), it was said that "Her work is of a high standard and she occupied a conspicuous position for a woman in the profession which she has chosen."

Aside from articles that she wrote for the New York Medical Journal, she wrote the book The History of Nursery and Child's Hospital, New York, which was published in 1893.

Personal life
Lukens had a farm in Pennsylvania, an apartment in New York, and a winter home called "Sequoia Lodge by the Sea" in Pacific Grove, California, which was built in 1906 by Emily Williams. She shared her homes with her companion, Mary Conrad.

Lukens died on June 16, 1917 and was interred at Laurel Hill Cemetery in Philadelphia.

References

External links
 
 

1844 births
1917 deaths
19th-century American women physicians
American feminists
American women non-fiction writers
American women's rights activists
Burials at Laurel Hill Cemetery (Philadelphia)
History of women's rights in the United States
Pharmacists from Philadelphia
Physicians from Philadelphia
Wikipedia articles incorporating text from A Woman of the Century
Woman's Medical College of Pennsylvania alumni